Sint-Amands is a town and a former municipality located in the Belgian province of Antwerp, Belgium. The municipality comprises the towns of Lippelo, Oppuurs and Sint-Amands proper. In 2021, Sint-Amands had a total population of 8,524. The total area is 15.58 km². Sint-Amands is located at the right bank of the Scheldt river.

Effective 1 January 2019, Puurs and Sint-Amands were merged into the new municipality of Puurs-Sint-Amands.

Points of interest

Heritage railway
The Dendermonde-Puurs Steam Railway is a heritage railroad that links up Puurs and Dendermonde. The maintenance road that runs alongside serves as a bicycle track. Bikers can leave the track in Sint-Amands and follow the scenic route up North on the banks of the river Scheldt.

Émile Verhaeren museum
Émile Adolphe Gustave Verhaeren (Dutch: [vərˈɦaːrən]; 21 May 1855 – 27 November 1916) was a Belgian poet who wrote in the French language and an art critic. He was one of the founders of the school of Symbolism and was nominated for the Nobel Prize in Literature on six occasions.

Mill museum
Various models and mill arrangements can be found within the museum. The museum also houses books, reference works, photos, magazines, newspaper clippings and paintings.

Notable people born in Sint-Amands
 Emile Verhaeren, poet (1855-1916). He died through a train accident in Rouen (France) on November 27, 1916. His grave is located on the bank of the Scheldt river.
 John Anthony Elet, (1802-1851). President of St. Louis University (1836-1840) and Xavier University Cincinnati (1840-1848).
 James Oliver Van de Velde, (1795-1855). President of St. Louis University (1840-1843), Bishop of Chicago and Natchez.
  (1769-1851). Leader of the Peasants' War. 
 Jan Amandus van Droogenbroeck (1835-1902). Poet and writer.

See also
 Klein-Brabant

References

External links

Official website - Information available in Dutch and limited information in French

Puurs-Sint-Amands
Former municipalities of Antwerp Province
Populated places in Antwerp Province